Augustine Jibrin (born October 7, 1988) is a retired Nigerian football player, who last played for Oulun Luistinseura in Finland. While in Finland he captained FC OPA and OPS already at the age of 21.

He was one of the very few foreign captains in Finnish professional football.

Honours
Individual
 Liga El Salvador Team-of-the-year: 2013–14

References

External links

1988 births
Living people
Nigerian footballers
Veikkausliiga players
Ettan Fotboll players
Oulun Palloseura players
Vaasan Palloseura players
Expatriate footballers in Finland
Expatriate footballers in Sweden
Expatriate footballers in El Salvador
Nigerian expatriate footballers
Nigerian expatriate sportspeople in El Salvador
Association football central defenders
NAF Rockets F.C. players